Koripalli Sreekanth (born 23 November 1992) is an Indian cricketer who plays for Andhra Pradesh. He made his first-class debut on 7 November 2015 in the 2015–16 Ranji Trophy.

He has the role of Batsman, using a right-handed bat and his bowling style is right-arm offbreak.

References

External links
 

1992 births
Living people
Indian cricketers
Andhra cricketers
Cricketers from Hyderabad, India